Philip Comi Gbeho (14 January 1904 – 24 September 1976) was a Ghanaian musician, composer and teacher. He is best known for his composition of the Ghana National Anthem. He was instrumental in the establishment of the Arts Council of Ghana and was a Director of Music and conductor of the National Symphony Orchestra in Ghana.

Early life
Philip Gbeho was born on Saturday, 14 January 1904, in Vodza, a fishing village in the suburb of Keta in the Volta Region. He attended Keta Roman Catholic Boys School, where he was introduced to the organ, which he learnt to play in a short time and even became a pupil organist until he left the school.

His father, Doe Gbeho, was a fisherman. His mother, Ametowofa, from the Gadzekpo family, was a trader who was also reputed to have musical talent and was a leader of the female singers in the village drumming and dancing group.

In January 1925 Philip Gbeho gained admission to the newly opened Achimota Teacher Training College in Accra. While studying to become a teacher, he took advantage of the tremendous facilities that the college offered in music to upgrade his own knowledge and practice of music. He was a pianist and violinist, both of which he excelled in because he developed his skills under the tutelage of expatriate teachers in Achimota College who were also very versatile in music.

Gbeho was also an accomplished indigenous musician, ever since childhood. He played nearly all the drums of the Ewe Agbadza orchestra as well as teach traditional Anlo songs. Achimota College encouraged the performance of traditional drumming and dancing from all parts of the country and so Gbeho had the opportunity of keeping up with his indigenous music by performing and teaching it.

Upon graduating as a teacher in December 1929, Gbeho returned to Keta to teach at the Roman Catholic Boys School. Since he was imbued with a strong passion for music he immediately resumed the role of organist at the St. Michael's Catholic Cathedral in Keta where he also founded the St. Cecilia's Choir (which is still in existence) and brought it to an unusually high performance standard in the District. He also started an informal school of music in Keta that prepared students for the external examinations of London's Victoria College of Music.

Later life

Philip Gbeho's indefatigable efforts in music in and around Keta caught the attention of the authorities of Achimota College who invited him in 1938, when an assistant music master was needed, to teach music at the college. Gbeho accepted and began a new career as a music master at Achimota that same year.

In 1949, he was offered a one-year scholarship by the British Council to study for the Licentiate diploma at the Trinity College of Music in the United Kingdom.

While studying in London, Gbeho soon caught the attention of the cultural community of that city by holding frequent lectures and demonstration sessions on African, especially Gold Coast, music. His dancing group, made up essentially of West African students, soon became very popular and performed in many halls, parks and on British television. Gbeho also became a regular broadcaster on the BBC overseas radio programmes, especially the then very popular "Calling West Africa" programme.

In 1950, Gbeho was granted a Gold Coast government extension scholarship to continue to study at Trinity College of Music for the Graduate of Trinity College (GTCL) degree in music. He continued simultaneously with his lectures, broadcasts and African music performances at various venues in London, including the Artists International Centre in Piccadilly, the West African Students' Union (WASU) Secretariat, Strawberry Hill College, the Royal Empire Society, the Royal Geographical Society, and Royal Kew Gardens.

At the same time, Gbeho also took the exams of the Royal Academy of Music privately and earned himself the L.R.A.M in the teaching of music.

He returned to the Gold Coast upon graduation to resume the teaching of music at the Achimota Secondary School. By now, his imagination had been fired sufficiently by the cultural experiences in the United Kingdom to embark on a campaign to popularize indigenous music in schools and colleges all round the country, but especially in the missionary schools. He also became a strong advocate of the establishment of an Arts Council and the building of a National Theatre. He also gave several talks on national radio in which he led a renaissance in traditional music in the face of obstacles placed in its way by colonial missionary overlords.

On his return to Ghana from his studies abroad, Gbeho dedicated his life to the teaching of music in Achimota School and, more importantly, to the reawakening of his countrymen and women about their cultural heritage, especially in music. He, together with his colleague teachers and friends like Ephraim Amu, fought hard to have the teaching of indigenous music inculcated n pupils especially in the first and second cycle schools. Even though this put him on a collision course with the Missions, which associated indigenous music with pagan worship, he persevered in his bid to gain acceptability and respect for African music and culture generally.

He gave several talks on Radio Ghana on indigenous music and the need to preserve it. "Think well of these things" was the regular phrase with which he often concluded his broadcast. The broadcast helped in leading a renaissance in traditional music in a country that had been brainwashed by its colonial overlords to regard their own culture as Primitive. In the promotion of Ghanaian culture, Gbeho was outstanding.

When in 1954, the government decided on setting up a statutory body to "foster, improve and preserve the traditional arts and culture of the Gold Coast", Gbeho was appointed the Chairman of the Interim-Committee for the Arts Council of the Gold Coast.

The Committee through its regular arts and crafts exhibitions and regional festivals organized at Ho, Tamale and Cape Coast whipped up interest in Ghanaian culture. The first National Festival of the Arts took place in Accra in March 1957 – the week of Ghana's independence. As part of the festival, 269 exhibitions were mounted from 27 February to 9 March at the Information Services Department show-room in Accra. A pageant which included the La Kpa dance of the Gas, the Akan Fontomfrom, the Yewe and Atsiagbekor of the Ewes, among other traditional dances, were also put up.  Three other performances staged at the pageant depicted the installation of an Akan Chief, the Birth of Highlife music and a visit at the turn of the century of a District Commissioner. Two plays, Zuchariah Fee in English and Papa Ye in Fante, were also presented by two amateur groups. More than 15,000 people watched the cultural dancing and drumming performed by 500 artistes on the night of Ghana's independence. Credit for the successful organization of the cultural events went to Gbeho, who had travelled all over the country to pick the best 500 dancers and the possible dances for presentation.

The other notable contribution of Gbeho to the music and cultural life of his country was the creation in 1963 of a National Symphony Orchestra and Choir to promote the understanding and enjoyment of western classical music.

National Anthem
On the eve of Ghana's Independence celebrations, Gbeho won an open competition to write the National Anthem for the newly independent Ghana. His composition remains the national anthem of Ghana until now.

The music for the new anthem to replace "God Save the Queen", which hitherto had been the country's anthem, was written by Philip Gbeho. His piece was one of numerous entries that had been presented to a National Anthem Selection Committee. Out of those entries, four were shortlisted and played regularly on radio for listeners to indicate their preferences. The choice was overwhelmingly in favour of Gbeho's composition. The first stanza of his piece went as follows:

      Lord God our father we pray thee,
      Be thou our guide in all our ways:
      May we united together
      Proclaim the dawn of our new day.
      Children of Ghana! Arise and uphold your cause,
      And blaze the trail of freedom far and wide.
      Oh God our Father hearken to our call
      And grant us peace here in our Fatherland.
For unexplained reasons, the government discarded the original words of Gbeho's piece for new ones written by a commissioned literary committee. It was those words that went with Gbeho's music as the National Anthem on 6 March 1957.

Honours and tributes

In his first broadcast as Chairman of the Arts Council of Ghana on 26 April 1954 Dr. Seth Cudjoe, who succeeded Gbeho as chairman, paid the following tribute:

"I do not think the present generation will ever forget the inspiration and immediate response which the interim committee (of the Arts Council) engendered from the start. Nor do I believe that Philip Gbeho’s great enthusiasm, energy and strong personality will be forgotten when the cultural history of our country comes to be re-written.  The achievement of the interim committee which he headed as chairman has laid the foundation on which the statutory Arts council of Ghana body cannot fail to build with success."

For Gbeho's effort in establishing the Arts Council of Ghana and in appreciation of his contribution to the cultural development of the country, he was in 1965 honoured with the Grand Medal.  In August 1972, the Arts Council of Ghana and the Ministry of Education added to his list of honours by presenting him with a plaque.  The citation accompanying the plaque recounts Gbeho's role in the interim committee of the Arts Council of Ghana and describes him as the “Father of the present Arts Council of Ghana”. His role as Director of Music and Conductor of the National Symphony Orchestra also attracted praise in the citation.

Geoffrey Mensah Amoah, the Director and leader of the National Symphony Orchestra, provides more about his former tutor and boss:

Gbeho was a great conductor and leader of the group.  Most memorable in his name is the collection he made of some popular highlife tunes and indigenous songs which he arranged for performance by the Orchestra and the Dance Company. In all, he wrote out eight indigenous Yewe songs: "Kondo Yi Yevuwo De Megboo", "Miawo Mie Gbona Afegame", "Enyo Enyo Nuto Yae Enyo", "Aklie Do Gokame Tu Di Le Anago", "Nuwo Za Medo O". It was also through his performance of G. F. Handel's Messiah at the Holy Spirit Cathedral that many choir groups got to know that it was possible to perform the tune with orchestral accompaniment.

Death
Philip Gbeho died on 24 September 1976. He was married with seven children. Those still living include: Victor Gbeho (Diplomat and Minister of Foreign Affairs in the Fourth Republic), Theresa Abui Tetteh (Organist, Music Teacher and Director of the National Symphony Orchestra Ghana) and Peter Tsatsu Gbeho (Director, Ministry of Information).

References

External links 
 Mr Philip Comi Gbeho

National anthem writers
1904 births
1976 deaths
People from Volta Region
Alumni of Trinity College of Music
Ewe people
Ghanaian Roman Catholics
Ghanaian composers
Gbeho family